Nikita Sergeyevich Golub (born 14 February 1997) is a Russian football player. He plays as a midfielder for FC Murom.

Club career
He made his debut in the Russian Football National League for FC Shinnik Yaroslavl on 22 August 2020 in a game against FC Veles Moscow.

References

External links
 
 Profile by Russian Football National League
 

1997 births
Sportspeople from Novgorod Oblast
People from Veliky Novgorod
Living people
Russian footballers
Association football forwards
FC Vityaz Podolsk players
FC Arsenal Tula players
FC Shinnik Yaroslavl players
FC Veles Moscow players
Russian First League players
Russian Second League players